Bharkhar is a village near Mohania in the state of Bihar, India.

This densely populated village is situated at distance of 2 KM north to the national highway NH-2 now NH 19 which is passing through near by place Mohania.  It had a population of 1396 in May 2009 and as per one estimate in 2022, it has population more than 5000. The nearest railway station is Bhabua Road (Local Market is Known by name Mohania) 2km away from the village

It is also connected with state highways "SH-14" which is 1.5 km away. SH-14 is a state highway runs through Bhabua to Buxur. Places to visit includes highly revered temples Sri  Mahavir Mandir  situated at centre of village and Maa Kaali Mandir situated on SH-14, 1.5km away from village. Both temples are highly revered, serene and well maintained place worth visiting. On day of Chhath puja, Maa Kaali Mandir on SH-14 attracts thousand visitors & worshipers.

This village has more than one connecting road to state highways, three government school, Panchayat Bhavan  and public water supply system

Geography and climate

Geography 
The total area of this village is 575 hectares.

Climate 
Bharkhar experiences a humid subtropical climate with large variations between summer and winter temperatures. Winters in Bharkahar see very large diurnal variations, with warm days and downright cold nights. The dry summer starts in April and lasts until June, followed by the monsoon season from July to October. Cold waves from the Himalaya region cause temperatures to dip across the city in the winter from December to February and temperatures below  are not uncommon. Fog is common in the winters, while hot dry winds, called loo, blow in the summers.

Transport 

Bharkhar is well connected by air, rail and road with the major Indian cities like New Delhi, Mumbai, Kolkata, Chennai, Pune, Ahmedabad, Indore, Bhopal, Bhubaneswar, Gwalior, Jabalpur, Ujjain, Jaipur, Patna, Jamshedpur, Hyderabad etc. The village is 776 km from Delhi, 1240 km from Secunderabad.

Road 
 National Highway 19 (NH 2 old) (GT Road): crosses through the nearby town Mohania
National Highway 219 : originates from the nearby town Mohania and connect Bhabhua, Chainpur, Chand, Chandauli
National Highway 319 (NH 30 old): originates from the nearby town Mohania and connect Dinara, Charpokhari, NH922 near Arrah (near capital Patna)
National Highway 319A (SH-14): originates from the nearby town Mohania and connecting Ramgarh, Chausa and terminating at its junction with NH124C near Buxar.

The Village is 180 km from Patna and 70 km from Varanasi by road.

Railway 
The name of the nearest railway station  is Bhabua Road railway station, situated on Howrah–Gaya–Mughalsarai–New Delhi Grand Cord line.
The station code is "BBU".

Airport 
Lal Bahadur Shastri International Airport, Varanasi, commonly known as Babatpur Airport, is the nearest airport, 75 km from Bharkahr. Indian carriers, including Air India, Kingfisher Airlines, Spicejet, and international carriers like Air India, Thai Airways International, Korean Air and Naaz Airlines operate from here.

Education 
This village can boast for having three government School

Worship places 

Sri Mahavir Mandir Situated at centre of the village
 Sri Kaali Mandir situated at SH-14, 1.5 km away
 Mundeshwari Temple, 30 Km from Village near Bhabhua

References

External links
https://web.archive.org/web/20110911040037/http://www.brandbihar.com/english/districts/bhabhua/Bhabhua_MOHANIA_Bharkhar_Bharkhar.html
https://web.archive.org/web/20120402085046/http://offerings.nic.in/directory/adminreps/viewGPmapcvills.asp?gpcode=93805&rlbtype=V

Villages in Kaimur district